

Common meanings
 Johnny Reb, personification of a Confederate soldier in the American Civil War
 Reb (Yiddish), an honorific title for a teacher

People
 Reb Anderson (born 1943), American Zen Buddhist teacher and writer
 Reb Beach (born 1963), American rock guitarist
 Reb Brown (born 1948), American actor
 Reb Russell (1889-1975), American Major League Baseball pitcher
 Reb Spikes (1888-1982), American jazz saxophonist and entrepreneur
 Lafayette Russell, American football player and actor
 REB, web handle of Columbine massacre shooter Eric Harris

Food chemistry
 Rebaudioside compounds from the stevia plant, used as sweeteners

REB
 Relativistic electron beam, streams of electrons moving at relativistic speeds
 Revised English Bible, a 1989 English language translation of the Bible
 Research ethics board, or institutional review board, type of committee that applies research ethics
 Rural Electrification Board, in Bangladesh - see Electricity distribution companies by country
 Rwanda Education Board, in Rwanda it is a part of the ministry of education(MINEDUC Rwanda) in charge of general education as the Workforce Development (WDA) is in charge of vocational schools

Other uses
 Reb River, Ethiopia

See also
 Rebound (disambiguation)

Lists of people by nickname